Chunyu or Chun-yu is a name of Chinese origin that may refer to:

Given name
Chen Chun-yu (1905–1963), Taiwanese songwriter and author also known as Tan Kun-giok
Dong Chunyu (born 1991), Chinese male soccer player
Li Chunyu (born 1986), Chinese male soccer player
Wang Chunyu (born 1995), Chinese female middle-distance runner
Francis Ng Chun-yu (born 1961), Hong Kong actor
Adderly Fong Chun-Yu (born 1990), Canadian racing driver

Family name
Chunyu Kun (4th century BC), Confucian philosopher and official
Chunyu Qiong (died 200), Chinese military general during the Han Dynasty
Chunyu Shi, administrator of Kuaiji during the Three Kingdoms

Chinese given names